Richard Malcolm Johnston (March 8, 1822 – September 23, 1898) was an American author.

Biography 

Johnson was born in Powelton, Hancock County, Georgia. His father was a Baptist minister, and his early education was received at a country school and finished at Mercer University. After graduating there he spent a year teaching and then took up the study of law and was admitted to the bar in 1843. In 1857, he accepted an appointment to the chair of belles-lettres and oratory at the University of Georgia in Athens, retaining it until the opening of the Civil War, when he began a school for boys on his farm near Sparta. This he kept going during the war, serving also for a time on the staff of Confederate general Joseph E. Brown, and helping to organize the state militia.

At the close of the war he moved to Maryland, where he opened the Pen Lucy School for boys in Baltimore. One of his teaching staff was Georgia-born poet Sidney Lanier, who persuaded him to begin to write for publication, although he was then more than 50 years old. His first stories were sent to Southern Magazine; others to The Century followed, and became immediately popular. His stories presented a nostalgic view of Southern plantation-based slavery that became the foundation of Lost Cause ideology.

His published works include: the Dukesborough Tales (1871–81), in which the impressions of his early school days in Georgia were elaborated; Old Mark Langston (1884); Two Gray Tourists (1885); Mr. Absolom Billingslea and Other Georgia Folks (1888); The Primes (1891); Widow Guthrie (1890); Ogeechee Cross Firings (1889); Old Times in New Georgia (1897); a Life of Alexander H. Stephens with whom he had been associated in law practice (1878). His autobiography was posthumously published in 1900.

He died in Baltimore, Maryland on September 23, 1898.

References

External links 
 
 
 
 Autobiography of Col. Richard Malcolm Johnston. Washington: The Neale Company, 1900.
 
 Rockby historical marker

1822 births
1898 deaths
American short story writers
American non-fiction writers
Writers from Georgia (U.S. state)
Converts to Roman Catholicism from Baptist denominations
University of Georgia faculty
People from Hancock County, Georgia
Writers from Baltimore
Catholics from Georgia (U.S. state)